Tikhvinsky (masculine), Tikhvinskaya (feminine), or Tikhvinskoye (neuter) may refer to:
Tikhvinsky District, a district of Leningrad Oblast, Russia
Tikhvinskoye Urban Settlement, a municipal formation corresponding to Tikhvinskoye Settlement Municipal Formation, an administrative division of Tikhvinsky District of Leningrad Oblast, Russia
Tikhvinsky (surname), a Russian last name
Tikhvinskoye (rural locality), a rural locality (a selo) in Rybinsky District of Yaroslavl Oblast, Russia